Elvin Richard Bishop (born October 21, 1942) is an American blues and rock music singer, guitarist, bandleader, and songwriter. An original member of the Paul Butterfield Blues Band, he was inducted into the Rock and Roll Hall of Fame as a member of that group in 2015 and the Blues Hall of Fame in his own right in 2016.

Bishop feels that the limitations of his voice have helped his songwriting.

Early life and education
Bishop was born in Glendale, California, the son of Mylda (Kleege) and Elvin Bishop, Sr. He grew up on a farm near Elliott, Iowa. His family moved to Tulsa when he was 10. There he attended Will Rogers High School, winning a full scholarship to the University of Chicago as a National Merit Scholar. He moved to Chicago in 1960 to attend the university, where he majored in physics.

Career
In 1963, Bishop met harmonica player Paul Butterfield in the neighborhood of Hyde Park, joined Butterfield's blues band, and remained with them for five years. Bishop was originally Butterfield's only guitarist, but was later joined by Mike Bloomfield, who largely took over the lead guitar role for the band's classic first two albums. After Bloomfield departed, the Butterfield Band's third album, The Resurrection of Pigboy Crabshaw, took its name from Bishop's nickname and his renewed role as lead guitarist. Bishop recorded a fourth album, In My Own Dream, with Butterfield, his last with the band, in 1968.

During his time with the Butterfield Blues Band, Bishop met blues guitarist Louis Myers at a show. Bishop persuaded Myers to trade his Gibson ES-345 for Bishop's Telecaster. Bishop liked the Gibson so much he never gave it back and has used it throughout his career. Bishop has nicknamed his Gibson ES-345 "Red Dog," a name he got from a roadie for the Allman Brothers Band.

In 1968, he went solo and formed the Elvin Bishop Group, also performing with Bloomfield and Al Kooper on their album titled The Live Adventures of Mike Bloomfield and Al Kooper. The group signed with Fillmore Records, which was owned by Bill Graham, who also owned the Fillmore music venues.

Bishop sat in with the Grateful Dead on June 8, 1969, at the Fillmore West in San Francisco. He opened the second set with the lengthy blues jam "Turn on Your Lovelight" without Pigpen or Jerry. He played two more songs with the Dead, "The Things I Used to Do" and "Who's Lovin' You Tonight."

In March 1971, The Elvin Bishop Group and The Allman Brothers Band co-billed a series of concerts at the Fillmore East. Bishop joined The Allman Brothers Band onstage for a rendition of his own song, "Drunken-Hearted Boy." Over the years, Bishop has recorded with many other blues artists, such as John Lee Hooker, and with Zydeco artist Clifton Chenier. In late 1975, he played guitar for a couple of tracks on Bo Diddley's The 20th Anniversary of Rock 'n' Roll album and, in 1995, he toured with B.B. King.

Bishop made an impression on album-oriented rock FM radio stations with "Travelin' Shoes" in 1975 but, a year later, in 1976, Bishop released his most memorable single, "Fooled Around and Fell in Love," which peaked at No. 3 in the US Billboard Hot 100 chart (and No. 34 in the UK Singles Chart). The recording featured vocalist Mickey Thomas and drummer Donny Baldwin who both later joined Jefferson Starship.

During the 1960s and 1970s he recorded for the Fillmore, Epic and Capricorn labels.

Bishop appeared at the 1984 Long Beach Blues Festival. In 1988, he signed with Alligator Records and released Big Fun featuring Whit Lehnberg & The Carptones, 1991's Don't Let the Bossman Get You Down!, 1995's Ace in the Hole, 1998's The Skin I'm In and That's My Partner (2000), on which he paired with an early Chicago blues teacher, Little Smokey Smothers. He later revisited Smothers in the studio, where the two recorded another album in 2009, Little Smokey Smothers & Elvin Bishop: Chicago Blues Buddies.

Bishop was inducted into the Oklahoma Jazz Hall of Fame in 1998.

In 2005, Bishop released his first new solo CD in seven years, Gettin' My Groove Back. In 2008, Bishop released The Blues Rolls On, on September 23, 2008, switching labels to Delta Groove Music. He was supported by Tommy Castro, James Cotton, Warren Haynes, B.B. King, Derek Trucks, George Thorogood, Kim Wilson, John Németh and Angela Strehli. The album was nominated for Grammy Award for Best Traditional Blues Album. In 2010, Bishop released Red Dog Speaks.

His first live concert DVD, That's My Thing: Elvin Bishop Live in Concert, was recorded live at the Club Fox in Redwood City, California, on December 17, 2011.  It was released on the Delta Groove label in October 2012.  The DVD was nominated for Best Blues DVD of 2012 by the Blues Foundation. The same organization announced that Bishop had six nominations for the 36th Blues Music Awards held in May 2015. He triumphed in three of them.

In April 2015, Bishop was inducted into the Rock and Roll Hall of Fame as an original member of the Paul Butterfield Blues Band.

In November 2017, his album Elvin Bishop's Big Fun Trio received a nomination for the Grammy Award for Best Traditional Blues Album. The Grammy was won by The Rolling Stones for Blue and Lonesome.

In November 2021, his album with Charlie Musselwhite, 100 Years of Blues, received a nomination for the Grammy Award for Best Traditional Blues Album.  Bishop lost to Cedric Burnside for his album I Be Trying.

Personal life
Bishop's daughter Selina and ex-wife Jennifer Villarin were murdered along with three other victims in an August 2000 crime spree. The culprits were later identified as Selina's then-boyfriend Glenn Taylor Helzer, Helzer's brother Justin Helzer, and accomplice Dawn Godman. The murders reportedly occurred as part of a scheme to extort money from an elderly couple from Concord, California. Both killers were sentenced to death for the murders; Justin Helzer, blind and partially paralyzed from an attempt on his own life while incarcerated, committed suicide in San Quentin prison.

In popular culture
Charlie Daniels mentions Bishop in his 1975 song "The South's Gonna Do It", with the lyric, "Elvin Bishop sittin' on a bale of hay; he ain't good lookin', but he sure can play." Bishop, on his 1974 album Let it Flow, had previously mentioned Charlie Daniels. Molly Hatchet also references Bishop in their 1978 song "Gator Country", with the lyrics, "Elvin Bishop out struttin' his stuff with little Miss Slick Titty Boom, I'm goin' back to the Gator Country and get me some elbow room."

"Fooled Around and Fell in Love" was included in the soundtrack album for Guardians of the Galaxy titled Awesome Mix Vol. 1. The song also is heard playing during the wedding reception scene after Billy Riggins and Mindy Collette were married in the Friday Night Lights episode "Tomorrow Blues" (Season 3, Episode 13). This song can also be heard playing in the background in the local bar scene between Sarah Jessica Parker and Luke Wilson in the movie The Family Stone.  Jeff Garlin's character plays this song during a scene in the Netflix comedy, Handsome.  The song was also featured in a memorable scene in the movie Boogie Nights (1997), at Jack's pool party early in the film, and was featured on the second volume of the movie soundtrack, Boogie Nights 2: More Music from the Original Motion Picture.
"Fooled Around and Fell in Love" is featured on the E.P. Love Letters by Bryan Ferry (of Roxy Music fame), released in 2022[[Love Letters(E.P.)

Discography

Studio albums

Live albums

Compilation albums 
The Best of Elvin Bishop: Crabshaw Rising (1975)
Sure Feels Good: The Best of Elvin Bishop (1992)
The Best of Elvin Bishop: Tulsa Shuffle (1994)
Party Till the Cows Come Home (Arcadia, 2004)

Chart singles

See also
List of 1970s one-hit wonders in the United States

References

Further reading 
 Westhoven, William, "Interview: Elvin Bishop and his “Red Dog” Gibson ES-345 — Together Almost 50 Years", Guitar World, July 10, 2011

External links

 Official Website

1942 births
Living people
American blues guitarists
American male guitarists
American blues singers
American rock guitarists
American rock songwriters
American male songwriters
American rock singers
Blues rock musicians
Chicago blues musicians
Musicians from Glendale, California
Musicians from Tulsa, Oklahoma
Singers from California
Songwriters from California
Songwriters from Oklahoma
Singers from Oklahoma
Guitarists from California
Guitarists from Oklahoma
Paul Butterfield Blues Band members
20th-century American guitarists
20th-century American male musicians
Blind Pig Records artists
Alligator Records artists
Capricorn Records artists